Sethu G Pillai is an Indian actor who appears in South Indian language films. He was born in Mavelikkara, Alappuzha district, Kerala. Sethu resides with his family in Kottayam, Kerala, India.  He is also called as Mynaa Sethu, after the film Mynaa, in which he had debuted as an actor. After the success of Mynaa, Sethu acted in many more movies like 100 Degree Celsius and Manadhil Maayam Seidhai that bombed in the box office. Currently, he has turned producer and has produced movies like Kokki and Karuppusamy Kuththagaithaarar.

Apart from being an actor and producer, Sethu is also the owner of Kayal International, a diversified business group with manufacturing and trading activities in garments, food processing, etc.

Career
Sethu started his cinema career in the Tamil film industry with the movie Mynaa. The film was released in November, 2010 and was produced by John Max and directed by Prabhu Solomon. The film launched the careers of many artists and technicians. Sethu played the role of DSP Bhaskar, a police officer. His was one of the key roles in the movie and his acting was widely appreciated. This led to him being popularly known as Mynaa Sethu.

After the release of Mynaa, Sethu took a break from cinema to concentrate on his other business activities. Sethu continued to receive offers for playing the role of cop in many movies. He returned to acting in 2013 with the movie Thank You in which he again played a cop, Dev Menon.

In 2014, Sethu acted in a Tamil / Telugu bilingual. The film was called Manadhil Maayam Seidhai in Tamil and Manasunu Maaya Seyake in Telugu. In the same year, the Malayalam movie 100 Degree Celsius in which he had acted was also released. The film was directed by Rakesh Gopan. In 2015, Sethu acted in the Tamil action movie Kadavul Paathi Mirugam Paathi.

Sethu takes his acting career very seriously and brings in total commitment and dedication to the roles he plays. An example of his dedication was when he had to smoke a cigarette for a role he was given and he did it though he was a non-smoker to make it more realistic in its portrayal. He enjoys doing Tamil films the most as he feels it gives him the maximum opportunities to showcase his acting talent.

Sethu has presently ventured into film production and has the produced the movies Kokki and Karuppusamy Kuththagaithaarar.

Filmography
As Actor

As Producer

Business career
Sethu is the owner of manufacturing and retail units in the garment industry. He has expanded and diversified his business activities by venturing into the food processing industry. He has recently inaugurated his new business named Kayal International and well on his way to make it one among the leaders in the food processing industry.

Personal life
Sethu was born in Mavelikkara in Alappuzha district of Kerala. He resides with his family in Kottayam, India. He has 2 kids Suryakiran and Aryakiran. Suryakiran is 13 years old while Aryakirans age is kept confidential. His children attends Pallikoodam School in Kottayam, founded by the renowned women's right activist Mary Roy.

References

External links
 http://spicyonion.com/actor/sethu-mynaa-movies-list/
 http://timesofindia.indiatimes.com/entertainment/malayalam/movies/news/Mwood-is-still-not-receptive-to-experiments-Sethu/articleshow/44801005.cms
 http://www.rediff.com/movies/review/south-review-mynaa-review/20101104.htm
 https://www.facebook.com/100DegreeCelsiusMovie/photos/a.316321995145655.70126.316310628480125/492358164208703
 https://www.imdb.com/name/nm5463539/
https://twitter.com/sethuactor?lang=en

Living people
Male actors in Tamil cinema
Year of birth missing (living people)
Male actors from Alappuzha
Male actors in Malayalam cinema
Indian male film actors
21st-century Indian male actors
Male actors in Telugu cinema